is a Japanese voice actress who was born in Kōchi and raised in Tokyo. One of her lesser known roles is that of the heroine Cornett Espoire in the Nippon Ichi Software game The Puppet Princess of Marl Kingdom. She voice acted both Rockman (Mega Man in the U.S.) and Roll in Marvel vs. Capcom: Clash of Super Heroes and Marvel vs. Capcom 2: New Age of Heroes, as well as Elena in Street Fighter III: New Generation and Street Fighter III 2nd Impact: Giant Attack. Fujino is a member of the band Ruururu.

Filmography
Chō Mashin Eiyūden Wataru (Shiiko)
Cyborg Kuro-chan (Pii-chan)
Slayers Next (Nene)
Garō Densetsu: The Motion Picture (Kim Dong Hwan)
Galaxy Fraulein Yuna: The Abyssal Fairy (Mami)
Marvel vs. Capcom: Clash of Super Heroes (Rockman, Roll, Baby Head)
Marvel vs. Capcom 2: New Age of Heroes (Rockman, Roll, Baby Head)
Street Fighter III: New Generation (Elena)
Street Fighter III 2nd Impact: Giant Attack (Elena, Effie, Poison)
The Puppet Princess of Marl Kingdom (Cornett Espoire)

References

External links

1972 births
Living people
Japanese video game actresses
Japanese voice actresses
Voice actors from Kōchi Prefecture
People from Kōchi, Kōchi
20th-century Japanese actresses
21st-century Japanese actresses